Unincorporated communities in Oklahoma do not have a formally organized municipal government. Rather, residents rely on the county government for services. State law allows unincorporated communities, under certain conditions, to incorporate or join another municipality

Many unincorporated communities were at one time incorporated but for various reasons no longer have a municipal government. Depopulation during the 1930s and 40s caused the loss of many communities and some no longer exist even as unincorporated communities. In Oklahoma, incorporated municipalities may petition for dissolution or be declared dissolved after missing two concurrent municipal elections (held April of odd numbered years). Platted unincorporated communities do have some right under the laws of Oklahoma that non-platted communities do not enjoy. A town plat is also one of the conditions required for incorporation.

Although unincorporated communities have no municipal governments, they may organize their own water districts or fire districts and tax citizens to support them. Additionally, many communities have school districts with elected school boards. Also, several unincorporated communities still have their own post offices.

Many unincorporated communities (such as Boggy Depot, Tuskahoma, and Skullyville) played important roles in the development of Oklahoma and others, especially those with schools and post offices, continue to be important centers in rural Oklahoma.

"Oklahoma Municipal Government" from the Oklahoma Almanac  published by the Oklahoma Department of Libraries is the source document for this list. Additional communities have been added using Wikipedia articles which cite authoritative sources. Geographic coordinates, if known, are provided for those place names which are unlikely to be communities.

List of unincorporated communities

A

B

C

D

E

F

G

H

I

J

K

L

M

N

O

P

Q

R

S

T

U

V

W

Y

Z

References

Bibliography
Oklahoma Department of Libraries. "Oklahoma Municipal Government". Oklahoma Almanac. (accessed February 11, 2007)
Oklahoma Historical Society. Chronicles of Oklahoma. (accessed February 11, 2007)
Oklahoma State Department of Education. "School Districts Database" (accessed February 11, 2007)
Shirk, George H. Oklahoma Place Names. Norman: University of Oklahoma Press, 1987:  .
Supreme Court of Oklahoma. "Oklahoma Statutes Citationized".Oklahoma State Courts Network (OSCN) (accessed February 11, 2007)
United States Census Bureau Fact Finder. Fact Sheet search. (accessed February 11, 2007)
United States Geological Survey. Geographic Names Information System. (accessed February 11, 2007)
United States Postal Service. ZIP Code Lookup. (accessed February 11, 2007)
Abandoned Oklahoma

 
Oklahoma